The All in Caravaning show is a caravaning and camping industry show held every year in Beijing, China. Established by Messe Düsseldorf (Shanghai) Co., Ltd, a subsidiary of Messe Düsseldorf GmbH, the show is tailored to meet the specific needs in China and Asia market since the year of 2012.

All in Caravaning showcases a wide spectrum of motorhomes, caravans, mobile homes, basic vehicles and accessories as well as the diverse offers for holidays and recreation.

Co-organizers 
 Messe Düsseldorf (Shanghai) Co., Ltd.
 YASN International Exhibition Co., Ltd.
 China National Travel Service (HK) Group Corporation
 The Recreational Vehicle Industry Committee of China Association of Automotive Manufacturers (CAAM)
 China Self-Driving Tour and Camping & Caravaning Association (STCCA）of CTACA

Statistics

References

Camping
Annual events in Beijing